Jack Garrett is a fictional character on the CBS crime drama Criminal Minds: Beyond Borders, portrayed by Gary Sinise. A 20-year veteran of the FBI, Garrett is the Unit Chief of the International Response Team based out of Washington D.C.

Background
Garrett is the Unit Chief of the International Response Team (IRT), which specializes in solving cases that involve American citizens on international soil. Through his job, he shares personal history with Aaron Hotchner and David Rossi of the FBI's Behavioral Analysis Unit and Clara Seger from his own team. Garrett's friendship with Rossi is also shown in the opening scene of the Criminal Minds: Beyond Borders seasons 1 episode "The Harmful One", where they have a practice session together at the gun range and bicker over negotiation tactics. Garrett once told Rossi that the reason he was still doing this job was to make the world a safer place for his family to live in.

Personal life
Garrett is married to his wife Karen (Sherry Stringfield) and together have six children, three sons and three daughters. Their oldest son Ryan is an FBI agent and has crossed paths with his father several times while on duty. Their second son Jack Jr is in the United States Army and daughters Millie and Josie are both in college. The two youngest, R.J. and Emma, are still in school and live at home.

Storylines
In the first episode of season 1, Garrett and the team head to Thailand and he contacts cultural anthropology expert and former agent Clara Seger for her assistance as she was already in the region. She had been on a two-year sabbatical following the death of her husband Brad. By the end of the episode Garrett extends an invitation for her to return to the IRT.

In the episode "Love Interrupted" he struggles over Josie's decision to attend the University of Southern California across the country rather than Florida State University, which would be nearer to home. Matthew Simmons, the only other character who is married with children, picks up on his mood and asks him "She's not ready or you're not ready?"

Character development and casting
During the initial planning stages for the spin-off and its potential main characters, showrunner Erica Messer had been introduced to Gary Sinise by Criminal Minds cast member Joe Mantegna, a long-time friend of Sinise. Messer decided that Sinise fit her idea of how the character who would serve as the unit chief should be portrayed. Prior to Beyond Borders, Sinise had been on hiatus from television, his last lead television role being Mac Taylor on the CBS crime procedural CSI: NY.

Sinise said of the character conceptualization, "In the beginning, we had wondered if this was going to be the type of law enforcement character who's had a difficult time, difficult home life. He's dealing with certain things that have haunted him." Messer stated that in her discussions with Sinise over the character, they decided to depart from portraying Jack Garrett as a divorcee or widower with a tragic past, similar to characters such as David Rossi from the original show or Sinise's character Mac Taylor from CSI: NY respectively. Instead they decided that Garrett would be a "success story" – he is happily married to his high school sweetheart and raised five children while maintaining a successful career in a demanding job.

Garrett is one of two main characters on the show who is happily married with children, the other being Matthew Simmons (Daniel Henney). Messer noted that both characters share similarities and saw Simmons as a younger version of Garrett.

References

External links
 Jack Garrett on IMDb

Criminal Minds characters
Fictional Federal Bureau of Investigation personnel
Television characters introduced in 2015
Criminal Minds: Beyond Borders
American male characters in television